Danny Seung-Joo Choi (born 6 December 1994) is an Australian professional footballer who plays as a winger for Blacktown City.

Early life
Choi was raised in Suwon, South Korea before moving to Australia in fifth grade, and spent five years in the country before returning to South Korea to play for Daejeon Citizen. He returned to Australia three years later, where his family still lived and believing that his footballing style was better adapted to Australian competition.

Club career
Choi's first senior club in Australia was Parramatta FC, where he was the side's Player of the Year in 2013.

On 27 July 2016, Choi scored a 70 metre goal from inside his own half in extra time to help Blacktown City to a win over Sydney United in the Round of 32 of the 2016 FFA Cup.

In October 2016, Choi signed with A-League club Adelaide United on an injury replacement contract for Marcelo Carrusca. He made his debut later in the month, hitting the post with a late shot in a loss to Melbourne Victory. His short term injury replacement contract expired after Carrusca returned to the squad and Choi himself suffered a stress fracture in his foot.

Danny recently played for Six Portuguese club from 2018 to 2022, before return to Blacktown City.

Honours

Club
Blacktown City
 National Premier Leagues: 2015
 National Premier Leagues NSW Championship: 2014, 2016
 National Premier Leagues NSW Premiership: 2014
 Waratah Cup: 2014

Individual
 Parramatta FC Player of the Year: 2013

References

External links

1994 births
People from Suwon
South Korean footballers
Naturalised soccer players of Australia
Australian soccer players
Living people
Association football wingers
Parramatta FC players
Blacktown City FC players
Adelaide United FC players
F.C. Oliveira do Hospital players
U.D. Leiria players
S.C. Beira-Mar players
Casa Pia A.C. players
Real S.C. players
U.S.C. Paredes players
A-League Men players
National Premier Leagues players
Campeonato de Portugal (league) players
Liga Portugal 2 players
South Korean expatriate footballers
Australian expatriate soccer players
Expatriate soccer players in Australia
Expatriate footballers in Portugal
Australian expatriate sportspeople in Portugal
Sportspeople from Gyeonggi Province